Mikhaylovka is a rural locality (a village) in Zyak-Ishmetovsky Selsoviet, Kuyurgazinsky District, Bashkortostan, Russia. The population was 256 as of 2010. There are 4 streets.

Geography 
Mikhaylovka is located 63 km northwest of Yermolayevo (the district's administrative centre) by road. Kiryushkino is the nearest rural locality.

References 

Rural localities in Kuyurgazinsky District